Jay Thomas Kelly (born August 15, 1950) is an American former professional baseball player, coach and manager. As the manager of the Minnesota Twins of Major League Baseball over 16 seasons from mid-September  through , he won two World Series championships. Currently, he serves as a special assistant to the general manager for the Twins.

Kelly was born in Graceville, Minnesota, and grew up in Sayreville, New Jersey, attending St. Mary's High School in nearby South Amboy.

Playing career
He was drafted by the Seattle Pilots in the eighth round of the 1968 Major League Baseball draft. After three unspectacular years in the Pilots/Milwaukee Brewers organization, he was given his unconditional release on April 6, 1971.

On April 28, 1971, Kelly was signed as a minor league free agent by the Twins and sent to the Double-A Charlotte Hornets in the Southern League. From 1972 through 1975, Kelly would spend most of his playing time with the Triple-A Tacoma Twins of the Pacific Coast League, splitting time between first base and the corner outfield positions.

After starting the  season again in Tacoma, Kelly was called up to the parent Twins and made his major league debut on May 11, 1975. Kelly would play in 49 games with the Twins over the 1975 season, getting into 43 games at first base and two in the outfield. In 147 plate appearances, he collected 15 bases on balls and 23 hits, with five doubles and one home run (a solo blast off Vern Ruhle at Tiger Stadium on 26 May), hitting a poor .181 with 11 runs batted in. Prior to the start of the  season, Kelly was purchased by the Baltimore Orioles and assigned to the Triple-A Rochester Red Wings; he would not return to the major leagues as an active player. In 1977, he returned to the Twins organization and Tacoma – spending part of the year as a player-manager. In 1978, Kelly appeared in 119 games for the Twins new Triple-A affiliate, the Toledo Mud Hens. It was his last year as a full-time player.

Managerial career
Following the 1978 season, Kelly was sent down to manage the Twins' Class A affiliate, the Visalia Oaks in the California League, staying there through the 1980 season. He then spent 1981 and 1982 as skipper of the Double-A Orlando Twins, winning the 1981 Southern League championship.

In , Kelly was appointed third-base coach on Minnesota manager Billy Gardner's big-league coaching staff. He retained the post when Ray Miller became skipper, and succeeded Miller as manager on September 12, 1986.

1987 World Series
A year after taking over the reins of the Twins from Miller, Kelly took the team that he had helped build through his role as one of the top people in the Twins' minor league organization and led it to a World Series championship. Though the '87 Twins were criticized for being the top team in a weak division (amassing only a .525 record in regular season play, which was the worst winning percentage for an eventual World Champion until surpassed by the St. Louis Cardinals in 2006), they easily handled the Detroit Tigers in five games, losing only Game 3 of the American League Championship Series to a heartbreaking 8th-inning two-run home run.

The World Series was a well-fought contest between the Twins and the National League champion St. Louis Cardinals, each team winning all of its home games. Games 1, 2, 4 and 6 were decidedly lopsided contests (10–1 Twins, 8–4 Twins, 7–2 Cards, 11–5 Twins), with Games 3, 5 and 7 being much closer contests, each being decided by only two runs (3–1 Cards, 4–2 Cards and 4–2 Twins).

After a 63-year drought, Tom Kelly's leadership helped propel the Twins to their second World Championship, and first since their 1961 relocation to Minneapolis.

1991 World Series
After finishing the 1990 season in last place with a 74-88 record, the Twins dominated the AL West in 1991, finishing 8 games ahead of the second-place Chicago White Sox with a 95–67 record.  During this season, the Twins set the club record of 15 consecutive wins, but this winning streak propelled them into first place. In the AL Championship, the Twins easily beat the Toronto Blue Jays in 5 games, winning the right to face the Atlanta Braves in the World Series. Marked by a series of close contests filled with dramatic plays and extra-innings, the 1991 World Series was later ranked by ESPN as the greatest World Series ever.

Following two closely contested victories at home, the Twins traveled to Atlanta where they suffered three straight defeats. Tom Kelly, prior to the Series' move to Atlanta, infamously said that managing without the designated hitter was "right up there with rocket science". Although he was being facetious, the grueling Game 3 proved Kelly prescient as a series of double switches and substitutions emptied the Twins' bench and both teams' bullpens. Kelly was forced to pinch hit Rick Aguilera in the top of the 12th and was prepared to send outfielder Dan Gladden to the mound if necessary; however, the Braves won in the bottom of the 12th when David Justice narrowly beat a throw to the plate. After a similarly close Game 4 and a dominating 14–5 Braves victory in Game 5, the Twins had to win the final two games at home.

Game 6 featured two climactic plays by Kirby Puckett who, in the top of the 3rd, made a sensational leaping catch against the center field acrylic glass to prevent a Braves' run. The Twins won 4–3 in the bottom of the 11th when Puckett blasted a home run off Charlie Leibrandt. Game 7 proved to be one of the greatest games in baseball history, as the game was scoreless for 9 innings and included a number of decisive and memorable plays. Twins starter Jack Morris argued repeatedly with Kelly to allow him to stay in the game and pitched 10 scoreless innings before the Twins won 1–0 in the bottom of the 10th, giving Minnesota its second World Series victory in five years.

Final years

In , management cleared all players earning over $1 million (except for pitcher Brad Radke) and rebuilt from the ground up; the team went 70–92 and in fourth place in the AL Central, 19 games behind the Cleveland Indians and five games ahead of the Detroit Tigers. On May 7, 2000, he won his 1,000th game as manager (having managed 2,092 games), doing so with a 4-0 victory over the Detroit Tigers at the Metrodome to become the 46th manager of the 1,000 wins club. 

A run of eight straight losing seasons ended in 2001, when the Twins led the division for much of the year before fading, finishing at 85–77, second to Cleveland. He then resigned at age 51, citing burnout, and the threat of contraction.  Kelly was succeeded as manager of the Twins by Ron Gardenhire, and his rebuilding efforts paid off the year after he retired from the Twins, with a repeat of divisional championships in 2002, 2003, and 2004.

The Twins announced on January 26, 2012 that they would retire Kelly's jersey number, #10, before a September 8, 2012 game.

Managerial record

Managerial record

See also
 List of Major League Baseball managers by wins
 List of Knights of Columbus

References

External links

1950 births
Living people
American sportsmen
Baseball coaches from Minnesota
Baseball managers
Baseball players from Minnesota
Charlotte Hornets (baseball) players
Clinton Pilots players
Jacksonville Suns players
Major League Baseball first basemen
Major League Baseball managers with retired numbers
Manager of the Year Award winners
Minnesota Twins coaches
Minnesota Twins managers
Minnesota Twins players
Minor league baseball managers
Newark Co-Pilots players
People from Graceville, Minnesota
People from Sayreville, New Jersey
Rochester Red Wings players
Tacoma Twins players
Toledo Mud Hens players
Visalia Oaks players
World Series-winning managers